Cham Shateh-ye Sofla (also Romanized as Cham Shateh-ye Soflá; also known as Cham Shīneh, Shīneh, and Şaḩneh) is a village in Qalayi Rural District, Firuzabad District, Selseleh County, Lorestan Province, Iran. At the 2006 census, its population was 26, in 5 families.

References 

Towns and villages in Selseleh County